"No, Not Now" is a song by Canadian indie rock band Hot Hot Heat and is taken from their first album, Make Up the Breakdown. The song was released in the UK as the second single from the album on July 28, 2003. It reached number 38 in the UK Singles Chart.

References

2003 singles
Hot Hot Heat songs
2002 songs
B-Unique Records singles
Songs written by Dante DeCaro
Songs written by Steve Bays